Maya the Bee is a French-German computer-animated comedy television series produced by Studio 100 Animation in association with ZDF for Germany, TF1 for France and ABC for Australia. It is based on the character Maya the Bee introduced in 1912. This is the second animated adaptation focused on the character, after the anime Maya the Honey Bee that aired in the 1970s. The show also aired on Sprout when the channel got revamped for its 10th anniversary year in 2015.

Voice cast
Note: season one only
Andrea Libman as Maya
 Rebecca Shoichet as Willy, Princess Natalie and Zoot
 Philip Hayes as Flip
 Kira Tozer as Miss Cassandra, Barry and Max
 Ellen Kennedy as Miss Bosby, The Queen, Thekla and Hannah
 Brian Drummond as Judge Beeswax, Kurt, Deez, Zip "Zig" and Edgar
 Samuel Vincent as Zap, Shelby, Paul, Stinger and Doz
 Diana Kaarina as Lara, Beatrice
 Tabitha St. Germain as Ben, Zoe and Lisby
Note: season two only
 Antonio Amadeo as Shelby 
 Eric Anderson  as Arnie
 Aurora Jane Baldovini as Maya
 Robin Brooke Burry as Max
 Rio Chavarro as Kurt
 Phil Dubois as Doz
 Todd Durkin as Judge Beeswax 
 Rayner Garrachan as Barney
 Lisa Grossman Comess as Miss Cassandra
 Scott Genn as Stinger
 Christina Groom as Theo
 Celia Gruss as Willy
 Christina Jopling as Barry
 Crystal López
 James Keller as Paul
 Jason Kesser 
 Wayne Legette as Flip
 Hali Beth Muller as Ben and Lara
 Paul Louis Muller
 Danny Paul Nweeia as Deez
 Elizabeth Rodriguez 
 Barbara Sloan
 David Steel (actor)  
 Amy Tanner (actress) as Beatrice 
 Laura Turnbull
 Gregg Weiner
 Ryan Yee

Series overview

Episodes

Season 1 (2012)

Season 2 (2017)

Controversy
In September 2017, parents spotted a drawing of a penis in the series' 35th episode. After the clip went viral on Facebook, Netflix temporarily removed the episode from the website. The episode subsequently returned with the offensive drawing edited out. The production company apologized to many fans and stated it was, "A very bad joke".

Games
Fly With Maya aka Maya the Bee Flying Challenge
Paint With Maya aka Maya Nature Paint

References

External links
 
 Spanish website
Maya the Bee Movie on Studio 100
Maya the Bee at IMDb

Maya the Bee
2010s French animated television series
2012 German television series debuts
Animation controversies in television
Censored television series
French children's animated adventure television series
French children's animated comedy television series
French children's animated fantasy television series
French computer-animated television series
German children's animated adventure television series
German children's animated comedy television series
German children's animated fantasy television series
German-language television shows
English-language television shows
French television shows based on children's books
Animated television series about insects
Obscenity controversies in animation
Obscenity controversies in television
2012 French television series debuts
2017 German television series endings
2017 French television series endings